Srednja Vas may refer to several places in Slovenia:

 Srednja Vas, Radovljica
 Srednja Vas, Semič
 Srednja Vas–Goriče
 Srednja Vas (Lavrica)
 Srednja Vas–Loški Potok
 Srednja Vas–Poljane
 Srednja Vas pri Dragi
 Srednja Vas pri Kamniku
 Srednja Vas pri Polhovem Gradcu
 Srednja Vas pri Šenčurju
 Srednja Vas v Bohinju